Soma Vogel (born 7 July 1997) is a Hungarian water polo player. He competed in the 2020 Summer Olympics.

References

1997 births
Living people
Water polo players at the 2020 Summer Olympics
Hungarian male water polo players
Water polo goalkeepers
Medalists at the 2020 Summer Olympics
Olympic bronze medalists for Hungary in water polo
21st-century Hungarian people